Events from the year 1692 in Denmark

Incumbents
 Monarch – Christian V

Events
 

 23 April – A royal order for the establishment of Sankt Annæ Plads is issued.
 4 September – The Royal Knight Academy in Copenhagen is established as a replacement for the closed Sorø Academy.
 10 December – Ole Judichær becomes the first factory director of the new Royal Danish Naval Dockyard at Nyholm in Copenhagen.

Births

Undated
 Nathanael Diesel, composer (died 1745)
 Marie Madeleine de Montaigu, actress (died 1837)

Deaths
 25 April – Gysbert Wigand Michelbecker, merchant and shipowner (born 1737 in Germany)

References

 
Denmark
Years of the 17th century in Denmark